Travieso is a surname. Notable people with the surname include:

Travieso (footballer) (1900–1975), Spanish football forward
Carmelo Travieso (born 1975), Puerto Rican basketball player
Carmen Clemente Travieso (1900–1983), Venezuelan journalist and women's rights activist
Frank Travieso (born 1980), Cuban-born American cyclist
Héctor Travieso, Cuban actor, comedian, and television host
Martín Travieso (1882–1971), Puerto Rican politician, senator, lawyer, and judge
Vicente Álvarez Travieso (1705–1779), Spanish judge and politician